Jim Duffy was a rugby league footballer who played in the New South Wales Rugby League (NWSWRL) for Eastern Suburbs.

Duffy, A forward, played six seasons with Eastern Suburbs club between 1915 and 1920.

References

Australian rugby league players
Sydney Roosters players
Rugby league second-rows
Rugby league props
Year of birth missing
Year of death missing
Place of birth missing